Minuscule 770 (in the Gregory-Aland numbering), A148 (von Soden), is a Greek minuscule manuscript of the New Testament written on parchment. Palaeographically it has been assigned to the 12th century. The manuscript has not been preserved in its entirety. Scrivener labelled it as 862e.

Description 
The codex contains the text of the Gospel of Matthew and Gospel of John, on 270 parchment leaves (size ), with lacunae. It lacks the text of Matthew 1:1-5:46. The text is written in one column per page, 24-26 lines per page.

It contains a commentary.
The text of the Gospels as well as a commentary was corrected by a later hand.

Text 
The Greek text of the codex is a representative of the Byzantine text-type. Aland placed it in Category V.

The lacks the Pericope Adulterae (John 7:53-8:11).

History 
F. H. A. Scrivener dated the manuscript to the 11th century; Gregory dated the manuscript to the 12th century. The manuscript is currently dated by the INTF to the 12th century.

The manuscript was noted in a catalogue from 1876.

It was added to the list of New Testament manuscripts by Scrivener (862) and Gregory (770). Gregory saw the manuscript in 1886.

The manuscript is now housed at the National Library of Greece (203) in Athens.

See also 

 List of New Testament minuscules
 Biblical manuscript
 Textual criticism
 Minuscule 769

References

Further reading

External links 
 Online images of the manuscript at the CSNTM.

Greek New Testament minuscules
12th-century biblical manuscripts
Manuscripts of the National Library of Greece